The San Francisco Redevelopment Agency (SFRA) was an urban renewal agency active from 1948 until 2012, with purpose to improve the urban landscape through "redesign, redevelopment, and rehabilitation" of specific areas of the city. 

SFRA demolished over 14,000 housing units in San Francisco between 1948 and 1976, claiming the agency was working on slum clearance and addressing urban "blight". They replaced the demolished units with newly built affordable housing, but was only able to replace a portion. It was succeeded by the San Francisco Office of Community Investment and Infrastructure (OCII).

History 
On August 10, 1948, the San Francisco Redevelopment Agency was formed under the California Community Redevelopment Law of 1945, and in response to the Housing Act of 1937. Initially the agency was not a separate department, but rather the functions were carried out by various city departments; however by 1950, the organization formed its own city department. The first agency Chairman in 1948 was Morgan Arthur Gunst; who had previously worked for the San Francisco Planning Commission.

From 1989 until 2011, the agency used tax increment financing as a major source of their funding (through a TIF law); which prompted the Mayor and the Board of Supervisors initiated a policy requiring that half of the agency's tax increment financing be used towards affordable housing in San Francisco.

The agency had removed 14,207 housing units between 1948 to 1978. They started a process of replacing the units with affordable housing; and by 2012, the agency had created 7,498 affordable units (a net loss of 6,709).

The agency was dissolved on February 1, 2012; in response to the Supreme Court of California decision issued on December 29, 2011 in the case, California Redevelopment Association et al. v. Ana Matosantos. The City and County of San Francisco created the Office of Community Investment and Infrastructure (OCII) as the successor agency.

Agency leadership 
 Morgan Arthur Gunst, the first Chairman, from 1948 to 1953
 James E. Lash, Executive Director
 Joseph Alioto, Chairman, from 1955 to 1959
 M. Justin Herman, Executive Director, April 1959 to August 1971
 Robert Rumsey, Executive Director, 1971 to 1974
 Wilbur Wyatt Hamilton, Executive Director, 1977 to 1987
 LeRoy King, Commissioner, 1980 to 2011
 Fred Blackwell, Executive Director, 2007 to 2011
 Tiffany Bohee, Interim Executive Director, 2012

Projects

Western Addition 
Due to the internment of Japanese Americans during World War II, the city had a surplus of buildings in Japantown. The SFRA took this as an opportunity for urban renewal to create the new Western Addition neighborhood — particularly the formation of the Fillmore District into an African American area. The creation of the Geary Street underpass was part of the project. 

By the 1970s, the San Francisco Redevelopment Agency had forced out 50,000 African Americans from the Fillmore District in order to build new housing and new commercial buildings. They had bulldozed the neighborhood but then left empty lots for some 30 years, destroying the once vibrant black community. 

In 2007, the SFRA built the "Fillmore Heritage Center" which included commercial spaces, black-owned apartments, a jazz club, and a theater space; but 10 years later most of the black community was forced out again because of the cost of living and gentrification.

Reception 
The agency was supported by elite of the city and by banks, businesses and the city government. The intent was to encourage the development in the city to include partnership with private investors.

However from the moment the agency was formed, there was vocal criticism and opposition from the African American community. The agency's policies caused thousands of residents, many of them poor and non-white, were forced to leave their homes and businesses.

List of projects 

 Diamond Heights neighborhood, active from 1948 to 1978.
 Western Addition (also called the Fillmore District), active from 1948 until January 2009.
 Golden Gateway, also known as Embarcadero-Lower Market, a former produce terminal area turned into a 17-block area of downtown, started in the 1950s.
 Yerba Buena Center (different from Yerba Buena Center for the Arts), an 87-acre project, active from 1966 to 2009.
 Butchertown, now known as India Basin, a former meat processing-area turned into industrial redevelopment, started in 1968
 Hunters Point Naval Shipyard, active from 1969 until 2009.
 Rincon and South Beach, active from 1970 to 1988
 South of Market, the 6th Street corridor, started after the 1989 earthquake
 Mission Bay, active from 2002
 Treasure Island
 Visitacion Valley
 Transbay Transit Center

See also 
 Slum clearance in the United States
 Subsidized housing in the United States
 San Francisco Planning and Urban Research Association

References

External links 
  San Francisco Redevelopment Agency Records from the San Francisco Historical Photograph Collection, San Francisco Public Library 

History of San Francisco
Government of San Francisco
1948 establishments in California
2012 disestablishments in California
Government agencies established in 1948
Government agencies disestablished in 2012